Lorentz is a surname and a given name.

Lorentz may also refer to:

Things named for Hendrik Lorentz
 Lorentz factor, Doppler effect
The Lorentz-Lorenz law, the law regarding the refractive index of a substance discovered independently by Hendrik Lorentz and Ludvig Lorenz 

 Lorentz force, the force exerted on a charged particle in an electromagnetic field
 Lorentz transformation, the formula that provides the mathematical backbone for Einstein's theory of special relativity
 The Lorentz group, the group containing all Lorentz transformations
 Lorentz-Cauchy distribution, a distribution used in fitting peaks in a spectrum
 Lorentz surface, a two-dimensional oriented smooth manifold with a conformal equivalence class of Lorentzian metrics. It is the analogue of a Riemann surface in indefinite signature
 Lorentz curve (disambiguation), various meanings
 Lorentz scalar, a scalar which is invariant under a Lorentz transformation
 Lorentz Institute, Instituut-Lorentz in Dutch, was established in 1921 and is the oldest institute for theoretical physics in The Netherlands
 List of things named after Hendrik Antoon Lorentz

Places
 Lorentz (crater), crater on the Moon
 Lorentz National Park, a national park in Indonesian New Guinea, named for Hendrikus Albertus Lorentz
 Lorentz River, located in Western New Guinea, Indonesia
 Lorentz, West Virginia

Other uses 
 Lorentz Medal, a prize awarded every four years by the Royal Netherlands Academy of Arts and Sciences
 Lorentz space, in mathematics, a function space named after the American mathematician George G. Lorentz.
 Lorentz catfish, a species of fish in the family Ariidae, the only member of the genus Tetranesodon, endemic to West Papua in Indonesia

See also 
 Lorenz (disambiguation)